Blaž Kramer (born 1 June 1996) is a Slovenian professional footballer who plays as a forward for Ekstraklasa side Legia Warsaw.

Club career
After a spell with VfL Wolfsburg II, Kramer joined FC Zürich on a three-year contract on 19 June 2019. He made his debut for the club in a 4–0 Swiss Super League loss to Lugano on 21 July 2019. With Zürich, he won the league title in the 2021–22 season, the club's first title in 13 years.

On 25 May 2022, he signed a three-year contract with Ekstraklasa side Legia Warsaw.

International career
Kramer made his Slovenia national team debut on 6 September 2020 in a UEFA Nations League game against Moldova, where he substituted Andraž Šporar in the 85th minute of the 1–0 home victory.

References

External links
 
 NZS profile 

1996 births
Living people
Sportspeople from Celje
Slovenian footballers
Association football forwards
Slovenia youth international footballers
Slovenia under-21 international footballers
Slovenia international footballers
NK Šampion players
NK Aluminij players
VfL Wolfsburg II players
FC Zürich players
Legia Warsaw players
Slovenian Second League players
Slovenian PrvaLiga players
Regionalliga players
Swiss Super League players
Ekstraklasa players
Slovenian expatriate footballers
Slovenian expatriate sportspeople in Germany
Expatriate footballers in Germany
Slovenian expatriate sportspeople in Switzerland
Expatriate footballers in Switzerland
Slovenian expatriate sportspeople in Poland
Expatriate footballers in Poland